The San Francisco International Film Festival (abbreviated as SFIFF), organized by the San Francisco Film Society, is held each spring for two weeks, presenting around 200 films from over 50 countries. The festival highlights current trends in international film and video production with an emphasis on work that has not yet secured U.S. distribution. In 2009, it served around 82,000 patrons, with screenings held in San Francisco and Berkeley.

In March 2014, Noah Cowan, former  executive director of the Toronto International Film Festival, became executive director of the SFFS and SFIFF, replacing Ted Hope. Prior to Hope, the festival was briefly headed by Bingham Ray, who served as SFFS executive director until his death after only ten weeks on the job in January 2012. Graham Leggat became the executive director of the San Francisco Film Society on October 17, 2005. The Scottish-born Leggat died on August 25, 2011 from cancer, aged 51.

The 63rd edition of the festival, originally scheduled for April 2020, but was ultimately postponed to 2021 due to the ongoing COVID-19 pandemic.

History
Founded in 1957 by film exhibitor Irving "Bud" Levin, the SFIFF began as a philanthropic effort to secure San Francisco's place in the international arts scene as well as expose locals to cinema as an art form. Akira Kurosawa's Throne of Blood and Satyajit Ray's Pather Panchali were among the films that screened at the first festival.

One obstacle in the early years was the lack of support from the major Hollywood studios, suggested reasons being the growing threat of international films' appeal and a fear that the festival would draw commercial attention away from the Oscars. It was not until 1959 that a major American film, Henry King's Beloved Infidel, starring Gregory Peck and Deborah Kerr, played at SFIFF.

Honors and Tributes

Irving M. Levin Directing Award
The Festival's directing award is named after SFIFF's founder, Irving Levin. From 2003 to 2014, the award was known as the Founder's Directing Award. Prior to 2003, the award was known as the Akira Kurosawa Award. Recipients include:
Mira Nair, 2016
Guillermo del Toro, 2015
Richard Linklater, 2014
Philip Kaufman, 2013
Kenneth Branagh, 2012
Oliver Stone, 2011
Walter Salles, 2010
Francis Ford Coppola, 2009
Mike Leigh, 2008
Spike Lee, 2007
Werner Herzog, 2006
Taylor Hackford, 2005
Miloš Forman, 2004
Robert Altman, 2003
Warren Beatty, 2002
Clint Eastwood, 2001
Abbas Kiarostami, 2000
Arturo Ripstein, 1999
Im Kwon-taek, 1998
Francesco Rosi, 1997
Arthur Penn, 1996
Stanley Donen, 1995
Manoel de Oliveira, 1994
Ousmane Sembène, 1993
Satyajit Ray, 1992
Marcel Carné, 1991
Jirí Menzel, 1990
Joseph L. Mankiewicz, 1989
Robert Bresson, 1988
Michael Powell, 1987
Akira Kurosawa, 1986

Peter J. Owens Award
Named for the longtime San Francisco benefactor of arts and charitable organizations Peter J. Owens (1936–91), this award honors an actor whose work exemplifies brilliance, independence and integrity.Recent recipients include:
Ellen Burstyn, 2016
Richard Gere, 2015
Jeremy Irons, 2014
Harrison Ford, 2013
Judy Davis, 2012
Terence Stamp, 2011
Robert Duvall, 2010
Robert Redford, 2009
Maria Bello, 2008
Robin Williams, 2007
Ed Harris, 2006
Joan Allen, 2005
Chris Cooper, 2004
Dustin Hoffman, 2003
Kevin Spacey, 2002
Stockard Channing, 2001
Winona Ryder, 2000
Sean Penn, 1999
Nicolas Cage, 1998
Annette Bening, 1997
Harvey Keitel, 1996

Kanbar Award
Recipients of the Kanbar Award for excellence in screenwriting include:

Tom McCarthy, 2016
Paul Schrader, 2015
Stephen Gaghan, 2014
Eric Roth, 2013
David Webb Peoples, 2012
Frank Pierson, 2011
James Schamus, 2010
James Toback, 2009
Peter Morgan, 2008
Robert Towne, 2007
Jean-Claude Carrière, 2006
Paul Haggis, 2005

Mel Novikoff Award
Named in honor of San Francisco film exhibitor Mel Novikoff (1922–87), this award is given to an individual or organization notable for making significant contributions to the Bay Area's film community.Recent recipients include:
Janus Films and The Criterion Collection, 2016
Lenny Borger, 2015
David Thomson, 2014
Peter von Bagh, 2013
Pierre Rissient, 2012
Serge Bromberg, 2011
Roger Ebert, 2010
Bruce Goldstein, 2009
James Lewis Hoberman, 2008
Kevin Brownlow, 2007
Anita Monga, 2005
Paolo Cherchi Usai, 2004
Manny Farber, 2003
David Francis, 2002
Cahiers du cinéma, 2001
San Francisco Cinematheque, 2001
Donald Krim, 2000
David Shepard, 2000
Adrienne Mancia, 1998

Golden Gate Persistence of Vision Award
The POV Award honors the lifetime achievement of a filmmaker whose work is crafting documentaries, short films, animation or work for television.Recent recipients include:
Nathaniel Dorsky, 2018
Aardman Animations, 2016
 Kim Longinotto, 2015
 Isaac Julien, 2014
 Jem Cohen, 2013
Barbara Kopple, 2012
Matthew Barney, 2011
Don Hertzfeldt, 2010
Lourdes Portillo, 2009
Errol Morris, 2008
Heddy Honigmann, 2007
Guy Maddin, 2006
Adam Curtis, 2005
Jon Else, 2004
Pat O'Neill, 2003
 Fernando Birri, 2002
 Kenneth Anger, 2001
 Faith Hubley, 2000
 Johan van der Keuken, 1999
 Robert Frank, 1998
 Jan Švankmajer, 1997

George Gund III Craft of Cinema Award
The George Gund III Craft of Cinema Award, given in tribute to the longstanding Film Society chairman of the board who died in 2013, honors filmmakers for their contributions to the art of cinema.Recent recipients include:
Peter Coyote, 2016
Maurice Kanbar, 2015
John Lasseter, 2014
Ray Dolby, 2013

Midnight Awards
The Film Festival's Midnight Awards were given from 2007–2011 to honor a young American actor and actress who have made outstanding contributions to independent and Hollywood cinema.Recent recipients include:
Clifton Collins, Jr. and Zoe Saldana, 2011
Evan Rachel Wood and Elijah Wood, 2009
Rose McGowan and Jason Lee, 2008
Rosario Dawson and Sam Rockwell, 2007

60th Anniversary Gala Changes 
In 2017, the San Francisco Film Society made a "strategic move" to set its 60th anniversary SF Film Awards Night closer to awards season in early December.

Awards and Prizes

New Directors Award
This $15,000 cash award supports innovative thinking by independent filmmakers and shines the spotlight on an emerging director. Films in this juried competition must be the director's first narrative feature and are selected for their unique artistic sensibility or vision.

Golden Gate Awards

The Golden Gate Awards is the competitive section for documentaries, animation, shorts, experimental film, and video, youth works and works for television. Eligibility requires that entries have a San Francisco Bay Area premiere and be exempt from a previous multiday commercial theatrical run or media broadcast of any kind. The festival currently awards cash prizes in the following categories:

Documentary Feature - prize: $20,000
Bay Area Documentary Feature - prize: $15,000
Documentary Short - prize: $5,000
Narrative Short - prize: $5,000
Animated Short - prize:  $2,000
Bay Area Short, First Prize - prize: $2,000
Bay Area Short, Second Prize - prize: $1,500
New Visions Short - prize: $1,500
Youth Work - prize: $1,500
Family Film - prize: $1,500

The Academy of Motion Picture Arts and Sciences recognizes the San Francisco International Film Festival as a qualifying festival for the short films (live action and animated) competitions of the 81st annual Academy Awards.

FIPRESCI Prize
Selected by the International Federation of Film Critics, the FIPRESCI Prize aims to promote film art, to encourage new and young cinema and to help films get better distribution and win greater public attention.

State of Cinema Address
Each year, the festival invites a prominent thinker to discuss the intersecting worlds of contemporary cinema, culture and society. Recent speakers include:
Boots Riley, 2019
Wesley Morris, 2016
Douglas Trumbull, 2015
Steven Soderbergh, 2013
Jonathan Lethem, 2012
Christine Vachon, 2011
Walter Murch, 2010
Mary Ellen Mark, 2009
Kevin Kelly, 2008
Peter Sellars, 2007
Tilda Swinton, 2006
Brad Bird, 2005
B. Ruby Rich, 2004
Michel Ciment, 2003

Live Music & Film
The San Francisco International Film Festival also involves live music and film events, which usually feature contemporary musicians performing original scores to classic silent films. Music/film pairings at SFIFF have included:
Scott Amendola, Matthias Bossi, Mike Patton, and William Winant accompanying Waxworks (1924 Film), Directed Paul Leni,  2013
Merrill Garbus (tUnE-yArDs) with Buster Keaton short films, 2012
Tindersticks with the films of Claire Denis, 2011
Stephin Merritt with 20,000 Leagues Under the Sea (1916 film), 2010
Dengue Fever (band) with The Lost World (1925 film), 2009
Black Francis with The Golem (1915 film), 2008
Jonathan Richman with The Phantom Carriage, 2007
Deerhoof with Heaven and Earth Magic, 2006
American Music Club with Street Angel (1928 film), 2005
Lambchop (band) with Sunrise: A Song of Two Humans, 2003
Superchunk with A Page of Madness, 2002
Yo La Tengo with Jean Painlevé short films, 2001
Tom Verlaine with classic silent short films, 2000

See also

 San Francisco Film Society

Notes

External links

Film festivals in the San Francisco Bay Area
Film festivals established in 1957
1957 establishments in California